Christophe Lambert may refer to:

 Christophe Lambert (footballer) (born 1987), Swiss footballer
 Christophe Lambert (judoka) (born 1985), German judoka
 Christophe Lambert, known as Christopher Lambert (born 1957), American-born French actor
 Christophe Lambert, CEO of EuropaCorp (2010–2016)

See also
 Christopher Lambert (disambiguation)